Herbie Smith may refer to:

 Herbie Smith (cricketer) (1914–1997), Australian cricketer
 Herbie Smith (footballer) (1895–1959), Australian rules footballer

See also 
 Herbert Smith (disambiguation)